Keith English (March 10, 1966 – December 2, 2010) was an American college and professional football player who was a punter for the Los Angeles Rams in 1990. He appeared in 15 games for the Rams, punting 68 time for 2,663 yards.  His longest punt was 58 yards, and his average was 39.2 yards.  English played college football for the University of Colorado, and was recognized as a consensus first-team selection to the 1988 College Football All-America Team. He was also a member of the Barcelona Dragons of the World League of American Football. 

Keith married Hillary Drum English on February 22, 1992. On November 24, 1998 they had a daughter named Madalyn Hillary English. On October 5, 2000 they had a son named Easton Glen English. They all lived in Littleton, Colorado. English died on December 2, 2010 in his sleep. He had been working in a human resources role for a restaurant company.

References

External links
Just Sports Stats

1966 births
2010 deaths
All-American college football players
American football punters
Colorado Buffaloes football players
Atlanta Falcons players
Los Angeles Rams players
Barcelona Dragons players
Players of American football from Denver